Hradčany is name of several locations in the Czech Republic:

 Hradčany, a district of Prague.
 Hradčany Airport, a former military airport in Northern Bohemia.
 Hradčany (Brno-Country District)
 Hradčany (Nymburk District)
 Hradčany (Přerov District)
 Hradčany-Kobeřice